Chain of Rocks Park (CoR) was an amusement park located in the St. Louis, Missouri area. CoR opened in 1927 and ceased operation in 1978. The park was situated across from the Chain of Rocks Bridge. CoR hosted many school picnics over the years.

Geography
The park was located on the bluffs overlooking the Mississippi River and was bordered by the Mississippi River on the east and by the neighborhood of Glasgow Village on the west.

The park was a favorite for many across the area - especially from North St. Louis County and St. Louis City.

The Park was accessed via Riverview Drive to Spring Garden Drive then to 10733 Lookaway Drive. The park was located where current day Lookaway Court is now.

See also 

 Neighborhoods of St. Louis
 Parks in St. Louis, Missouri
 People and culture of St. Louis, Missouri

External links
Forest Park Highlands CoR Link
Facebook group: Images and descriptions of Chain of Rocks Fun Fair amusement park

History of St. Louis
Defunct amusement parks in the United States
Closed amusement parks